Coswinsawsin is a hamlet in the parish of Gwinear-Gwithian (where the 2011 Census population was included ), Cornwall, England.

References

Hamlets in Cornwall